Kismet is a -long superyacht which was built by Lürssen in 2014. It is managed by the Moran Yacht & Ship chartering business, and is owned by Pakistani-American billionaire Shahid Khan.

Design and description
Kismet can carry 28 crew members at a time, and has eight state rooms which provide a capacity for 16 guests. Its design includes large and open public spaces for lounging and dining, and the rooms are stylized with exotic woods, handcrafted textiles, marble and leather. The exterior is notable for its large-sized windows across all decks.

It was finished in a luxurious style by Reymond Langton and Espen Øino (Oeino), with an expensive interior design. The fittings were specified to be better than a "five star hotel", featuring a deck of black marble and a large bath made of solid onyx. The yacht is complete with a swimming pool, barbecue area, movie theatre, sauna, helipad, elevator and gymnasium. Other amenities and provisions include an onboard internet connection, underwater lighting, and stabilizers at the anchor and underway.

Construction and career
Kismit was order from Lurssen and constructed at Krögerwerft's shipyard in Schacht-Audorf, Germany. Construction was completed in October 2014, with the yacht entering service that year. The word kismet means "destiny" or "fate" in Khan's native language Urdu and many other languages. According to Yacht Harbour, Kismet is worth an estimated $200 million. It has a charter price of $1.2 million per week, excluding food, fuel and dockage costs. 

In mid-2018, the yacht was rented by Jay-Z and Beyoncé during a vacation to Italy. Kismet was featured in the 2019 Netflix film 6 Underground starring Ryan Reynolds. The yacht was listed for sale in 2023.

References

External links

Moran Yacht & Ship - Kismet project

2014 ships
Motor yachts
Shahid Khan
Ships built in Bremen (state)